"Crazy" is a song by American rock band From Ashes to New. It was their first single off of their second album The Future. It peaked at number 3 on the Billboard Mainstream Rock Songs chart in July 2018.

Background
The song was released as the first single from their second studio album, The Future, released ahead of the album itself in February 2018. The song debuted with a lyric video on February 2, followed by a full-fledged music video later being released a month later on March 6. The song was the first to be released with the band's new lineup; band founder Matt Brandyberry and guitarist Lance Dowdle returned from the earlier lineup, alongside new vocalist Danny Case and new drummer Mat Madiro, previously the drummer of Trivium. In July 2018, the song peaked  at number 3 on the Billboard Mainstream Rock Songs chart, making it the band's highest charting song, ahead of "Through It All", which peaked at number 6.

Themes and composition
The song's lyrics were written around an experience of Case's, with him explaining:  Brandyberry stated that the song was also inspired by the difficulties he had been going through with the band in the years prior, including members leaving the band, and his resulting stress and anxiety because of it.

Personnel
Band

 Danny Case – vocals 
 Matt Brandyberry – vocals, rap vocals, keyboards, rhythm guitar
 Lance Dowdle – lead guitar 
 Mat Madiro – drums

Charts

References

2018 songs
2018 singles
From Ashes to New songs